Lauterwasser is a German surname. Notable people with the surname include:

Alexander Lauterwasser (born 1951), German researcher and photographer
Jack Lauterwasser (1904–2003), English cyclist
Siegfried Lauterwasser (1913–2000), German photographer

German-language surnames